The 2014 FIBA Basketball World Cup  Final was a basketball game that took place on 14 September 2014 at Palacio de Deportes de la Comunidad de Madrid in Madrid, Spain, to determine the winner of the 2014 FIBA Basketball World Cup.

With the United States victory, they tied Yugoslavia with five titles, the most in this competition. They also qualified to the 2016 Summer Olympics.

Route to the final

United States

The Americans qualified by virtue of being the defending Olympic champions, after defeating  in the 2012 gold medal game. The United States were one of the seeded teams in the draw.

The United States faced wild cards  in their first game. The United States never looked back after, erecting a 60–18 lead at halftime, to score its first win. In the rematch of 2010's final,  had a 5-point advantage at the half, but the Americans outscored the Turks 63–37 in the second half, to notch their second win. In their next game, the United States again won easily, this time against , to remain undefeated in group play. Against , the Americans closed out group play undefeated, netting a fifth consecutive double-digit victory.

In the round of 16, the United States withstood a 25-point game-high effort by Gustavo Ayón, to record a 23-point win against . The Slovenians faced the United States in the quarterfinals, holding the USA scoreless in the first two minutes, but once the Americans scored, they went on a 7–0 run, and never relinquished the lead. The semifinal was a rematch of the 2010 semifinal against ; the latter kept it close during the first quarter, until when Klay Thompson scored, to give the USA a 10–9 lead. The Lithuanians kept within striking distance throughout the first half, but an unanswered 10–0 USA run, at the beginning of the third quarter, sealed a return to the final for the USA.

Serbia

Serbia qualified by finishing seventh at FIBA EuroBasket 2013.

In their first game, Serbia had an easy win against , with Miloš Teodosić scoring 15 points to lead the Serbs. The Serbs then faced  in their next game. The French trailed at halftime, but Edwin Jackson converted three three-pointers to keep France close. Boris Diaw tied the game with four seconds left, then Joffrey Lauvergne scored from the free-throw line, to give Serbia their first loss. Haddadi was foiled when Serbia forced him to commit his fourth foul, just before halftime. Although the Serbian players who guarded Haddadi also battled foul trouble, they pulled through in the end. Serbia were assured of a final round berth by their last group game against , but lost 73–89, to finish fourth in the group.

Serbia faced Group B winners  in the round of 16. After the Greeks had their first lead of the game late in the first half, Nikola Kalinić scored on a three-point play that gave them the lead for good. Serbia limited Greece to 13 points in the third quarter, en route to a win. Bogdan Bogdanović had a game-high 21 points, and four other Serbs scored in double figures, to send Serbia to the quarterfinals. All Group A teams qualified to the quarterfinals, with Brazil netting a rematch with Serbia. With Brazil within striking distance throughout the game, Tiago Splitter and Nenê were assessed technical fouls in the third quarter; Serbia had a seven-point possession, and never trailed again.  then defeated , to arrange a rematch with Serbia in the semifinals. Serbia had a 9–0 run in the second period, to give them a 30–15 advantage. France cut the lead to ten, early in the fourth quarter. Boris Diaw, Nicolas Batum and Evan Fournier made three-pointers, to cut the deficit to four points, with five minutes left. Teodosić and Bogdanović scored their own three-pointers, to pad the lead to nine, when the French converted more three-pointers to cut the lead to three, with 48 seconds left. Thomas Heurtel converted both free-throws to cut the lead to one point, but Teodosić missed a field-goal. Heurtel split his free-throws off Teodosić's foul, then Serbia scored four points, Batum made a three-pointer for France, and Marko Simonović made both free-throws to seal the win for Serbia.

Match details
This was the first meeting between Serbia and the United States at the World Cup.

Serbia made their first five shots of the game, to race to a 10–5 lead. After the U.S. timeout, Serbia scored anew, then the Americans had a 17–3 run to go up by seven. Kyrie Irving and Klay Thompson scored three-pointers, to give the USA a 35–21 lead. In the second quarter, the United States made six more three point shots, to give them a 26-point lead at the half. The Americans erected the largest lead, at 39 points midway through the third quarter.

The Americans shot 58% from the field and 50% from beyond the three-point line in the game, won all nine games by an average of 32.5 points, and qualified to the 2016 Summer Olympics. Kyrie Irving was named the tournament MVP.

After being defeated, the Serbian team was received by a raucous crowd, upon their return to Belgrade. This was the best finish of a national team featuring Serb players, since the 2002 FIBA World Championship in Indianapolis, where Yugoslavia defeated  in the final.

*– Starters

References

External links
 
 

Final
2014 FIBA Basketball World Cup Final
2014 FIBA Basketball World Cup Final
Sports competitions in Madrid
Serbia–United States relations
FIBA Basketball World Cup Finals
Final
Final
September 2014 sports events in Europe